Kecskéd KSK is a football club based in Kecskéd, Komárom-Esztergom County, Hungary, that competes in the county championship, the third tier of Hungarian football.

History
Kecskéd lost 10–0 to Kisvárda in the 2020–21 Magyar Kupa season.

External links
 Official website of Kecskéd KSK
 Profile on Magyar Futball

References

Football clubs in Hungary
Association football clubs established in 1947
1947 establishments in Hungary